Shi Gaofeng (born 16 January 1992) is a Chinese fencer.

Gaofeng began fencing during when he was about 12 years old. He was later scouted by a fencing coach after he joined the Nantong Sport School. He is right-handed and is an épée fencer.

He was one of 406 athletes chosen to represent China at the 2020 Tokyo Summer Olympics, as part of the Men's Épée Team.

References 

1992 births
Living people
Chinese male épée fencers
Fencers at the 2018 Asian Games
Asian Games silver medalists for China
Asian Games medalists in fencing
Medalists at the 2018 Asian Games